Calamagrostis arundinacea is a species of bunch grass in the family Poaceae, native to Eurasia, China and India. Under its synonym Calamagrostis brachytricha it has gained the Royal Horticultural Society's Award of Garden Merit.

Description
The fruit is a caryopsis with an additional pericarp.

References

arundinacea
Plants described in 1753
Taxa named by Carl Linnaeus
Flora of Asia
Flora of Europe